Trifolium hirtum is a species of clover known by the common name rose clover. It is native to Europe, Western Asia, and North Africa. It is present elsewhere as an introduced species and it is cultivated as a cover crop and animal fodder. It was introduced to California from Turkey in the 1940s as a forage crop, and today it is a widespread roadside weed there.

It is a hairy annual herb growing erect in form. The leaves have oval leaflets up to 2.5 centimeters long and bristle-tipped stipules. The inflorescence is a head of flowers about 1.5 centimeters wide. Each flower has a calyx of sepals with long, needlelike lobes that may harden into bristles with age. The calyces are coated in long hairs. The flower has a pink corolla 1 or 1.5 centimeters long.

References

External links

Jepson Manual Treatment

Photo gallery

hirtum
Flora of North Africa
Flora of Western Asia
Flora of Europe
Fodder
Taxa named by Carlo Allioni